The 2018 Japanese Super Formula Championship was the forty-sixth season of premier Japanese open-wheel motor racing, and the sixth under the moniker of Super Formula. The season began on 22 April and is scheduled to end on 28 October at the same place after seven rounds.

2018 was the final season that the Dallara SF14 chassis package—which débuted in the 2014 Super Formula Championship—was used in competition; as a brand new chassis package will be introduced for the 2019 season but the engine configuration will remain the same.

Teams and drivers

Driver changes
Nissan Super GT driver Katsumasa Chiyo replaced Takashi Kogure in the B-MAX Racing Team.
 2017 World Series Formula V8 3.5 champion Pietro Fittipaldi replaced Felix Rosenqvist in the Team LeMans. Tom Dillmann is scheduled to substitute Fittipaldi at the Autopolis and Sugo rounds, who will be busy due to his 2018 IndyCar Series commitments.  After Fittipaldi was injured at the 6 Hours of Spa-Francorchamps, Dillman replaced Fittipaldi for more rounds.
 Pierre Gasly left the series to compete in Formula One with Scuderia Toro Rosso. His place at Team Mugen was taken by Nirei Fukuzumi, who finished third in the 2017 GP3 Series. Fukuzumi will also compete in the FIA Formula 2 Championship, and is set to prioritise F2 rounds over Super Formula where any dates clash.
 André Lotterer left the TOM'S team and the championship after fifteen consecutive seasons since 2003. His seat was taken by James Rossiter, formerly of Kondo Racing who returns after a season out.
 Nobuharu Matsushita returned to Japan after two seasons in the GP2 Series and one season in the FIA Formula 2 Championship, joining Docomo Team Dandelion Racing. He takes the seat of Takuya Izawa, who moved to Nakajima Racing.
 Ryo Hirakawa returned to Super Formula for the first time since 2015 with Team Impul, replacing Jann Mardenborough.

Race calendar and results
Due to scheduling restrictions imposed by the concurrent Japan WTCR round, the final round of the calendar at Suzuka Circuit will now feature a single race instead of the originally planned double-header.

Championship standings

Drivers' Championship
Scoring system

Driver standings

Teams' Championship

Notes

References

External links
Japanese Championship Super Formula official website 

2018
Super Formula
Super Formula